Khaya grandifoliola, also called African mahogany, Benin mahogany, large-leaved mahogany, or Senegal mahogany, is a species of plant in the family Meliaceae. It is found in Benin, the Democratic Republic of the Congo, Ivory Coast, Ghana, Guinea, Nigeria, Sudan, Togo, and Uganda. It is threatened by habitat loss.

Medical uses
In many malaria endemic countries, like the tropics, the extract of Khaya grandifoliola is used as an antimalarial herbal remedy. Recent studies show that 90% of malaria cases around the world come from sub-Saharan Africa. People in these areas resort to medicinal plants for treatment because alternative medical resources are often low or unavailable. The bark and seeds of Khaya grandifoliola are the most common parts used for treatment and are extracted by infusion or decoction. The extracts have proven to fight against the P. falciparum parasite, one of the vectors of malaria in humans.

Crude water extracts of Khaya grandifoliola have shown to have therapeutic effectiveness on mice. A study was designed to show the effects of the extract on the red blood cells and bone of mice for 3 weeks and 7 day. Doses of the extract that were administered daily had no impact on mortality rates, physical appearance or behavior of the rats. The results of the experiment indicated that K. grandifoliola had a positive effect on red blood cell production and no real effect on bone mineral contents at therapeutic doses. Studies have shown that the optimum therapeutic dose size is about 5.5 g/kg body weight.

References

Sources

grandifoliola
Flora of South Tropical Africa
Flora of West Tropical Africa
Flora of West-Central Tropical Africa
Vulnerable flora of Africa
Taxonomy articles created by Polbot